Dan Lowes (born October 10, 1996), better known as D-low, is an English beatboxer. He was inspired to start beatboxing after watching Beardyman performing it.

Achievements

Personal life 
He tore his uvula after attempting to mix the sounds liproll and snore bass and have deep inwardbass.

Discography

Singles

As lead artist

As promotional singles

References 

People from Swindon
Musicians from Wiltshire
British beatboxers
1996 births
Living people